Erdenekhairkhan (precious mountain) is a sum of Zavkhan Province in western Mongolia. The sum centre is 13 km South to Goliin Ekh ( River Source), the source of Elsiin River ( Sandy River) running to the Airag Lake. In 2005, its population was 1,771.

References 

Districts of Zavkhan Province